The Cuyamaca complex is a precolumbian complex, dating from the late Holocene, with archaeological sites in San Diego County, California. This complex is related to the Kumeyaay peoples.

This archaeological pattern was defined by Delbert L. True in the 1960s, on the basis of late prehistoric evidence from the territory of the Kumeyaay people, primarily in Cuyamaca Rancho State Park. Hual-Cu-Cuish (SDI-860) is another Cuyamaca complex site. 

This complex is in part synonymous with the Yuman III pattern proposed by Malcolm J. Rogers and the Patayan Complex that is primarily associated with the Colorado Desert to the east.

The interpretation of the Cuyamaca Complex was elaborated primarily in contrast with the San Luis Rey Complex, which existed contemporaneously in the Palomar Mountain area of northern San Diego County, within Luiseño territory. Elements that set the Cuyamaca Complex apart from the San Luis Rey Complex, according to True, include:
 defined cemetery areas apart from living areas
 use of grave markers
 cremated human remains placed in urns
 use of specially made mortuary offerings such as miniature vessels, miniature arrow-shaft straighteners, and elaborate projectile points
 preference for side-notched Desert and Cottonwood projectile points
 substantial numbers of scraping tools
 emphasis on use of Tizon and Lower Colorado ceramics
 steatite industry
 substantially higher frequency of milling stone tools
 clay-lined hearths

Notes

References
 True, D. L. 1970. Investigations of a Late Prehistoric Complex in Cuyamaca Rancho State Park, San Diego County, California. Archaeological Survey Monograph. University of California, Los Angeles.

Further reading
 Gamble, Lynn. 2004. "New Perspectives on the Cuyamaca Complex: Archaeological Investigations at Camp Hual-Cu-Cuish, CA-SDI-945". Proceedings of the Society for California Archaeology 14:93–106.
 Gross, G. Timothy, and Michael Sampson. 1990. "Archaeological Studies of Late Prehistoric Sites in the Cuyamaca Mountains, San Diego County, California". Proceedings of the Society for California Archaeology 3:135–148.
 Guerrero, Monica. 2004. "A Possible Cuyamaca Complex Site at CA-SDI-945, Camp Hual-Cu-Cuish, Cuyamaca Rancho State Park, California". Proceedings of the Society for California Archaeology 14:107–113.
 True, D. L. 1966. Archaeological Differentiation of Shoshonean and yuman Speaking Groups in Southern California. Unpublished Ph.D. dissertation, Department of Anthropology, University of California, Los Angeles.

Kumeyaay
Pre-Columbian cultures
Archaeological sites in California
Pre-Columbian archaeological sites